This article lists political parties in Argentina.

Argentina has a multi-party system with two strong political parties or alliances, and various smaller parties that enjoy representation at the National Congress.

Since the 1990s, there is a strong decentralizing tendency within the national parties, along with the growing national relevance of province-level parties and alliances. In the last decade, most of the newly formed parties remained as junior partners of the main alliances or as district-level relevant political forces.

Historic background
From the "national organisation" process (1862–80) up to 1916, the oligarchic National Autonomist Party directed Argentine politics, before being replaced, through the first secret ballot elections, by the Radical Civic Union. The "Infamous Decade" (1930–43), initiated by the first modern coup d'état in Argentina, represented a return of the conservatives, who implemented a so-called "patriotic fraud" electoral practice. Since 1946, the strongest party has been the Justicialist Party, emerging around the leadership of Juan Perón (when not banned, justicialists lost only three presidential elections, in 1983, 1999 and 2015). From 1946 to 2001, the second most important party was the Radical Civic Union, until the 2001 financial crisis. From then on, left-wing Justicialists Néstor Kirchner and his wife Cristina Fernández de Kirchner won the 2003, 2007 and 2011 general elections. After that, in the 2015 general election, Kirchnerism was defeated by a Centre-right coalition, Cambiemos, composed of the Radical Civic Union and Republican Proposal, a new liberal conservative party. However, in the elections of 2019, the Justicialist Party joined the Frente de Todos (a Centre-left coalition) which won the presidential elections. The PJ returned to power, with Alberto Fernández as President of the Nation.

Electoral alliances

National alliances

Provincial alliances
Provincial electoral alliances and coalitions active as of the 2019 general election.

Notes

Political parties

National parties 
Parties recognized in at least 5 provinces, as of 31 July 2021.

Provincial parties 
Parties recognized in at least one province, as of 31 October 2020.

City of Buenos Aires

Buenos Aires Province

Catamarca

Chaco

Chubut

Córdoba

Corrientes

Entre Ríos

Formosa

Jujuy

La Pampa

La Rioja

Mendoza

Misiones

Neuquén

Río Negro

Salta

San Juan

San Luis

Santa Cruz

Santa Fe

Santiago del Estero

Tierra del Fuego

Tucumán

Defunct parties and alliances
19th Century and early 20th Century
Unitarian Party (Partido Unitario)
Federalist Party (Partido Federal)
National Autonomist Party (Partido Autonomista Nacional, PAN)
Civic Union of the Youth (Unión Cívica de la Juventud, UCJ)
Civic Union (Unión Cívica)
National Civic Union (Unión Cívica Nacional, UCN)
National Autonomist Party (Modernist) (Partido Autonomista Nacional, línea modernista)
Lencinism (Mendoza) (Lencinismo)
Antipersonalist Radical Civic Union (Unión Cívica Radical Antipersonalista, UCR-A)
Rightist Confederation (Confederación Derechista)
Independent Socialist Party (Partido Socialista Independiente, PSI)
National Democratic Party (Partido Democrático Nacional, PDN)
Concordancia

Mid 20th Century
Democratic Union (Unión Democrática, UD)
Radical Civic Union (Junta Renovadora) (Unión Cívica Radical, Junta Renovadora)
Independent Party (Partido Independiente)
Labour Party (Partido Laborista, PL)
Peronist Party (Partido Peronista, PP)
Female Peronist Party (Partido Peronista Femenino)
Intransigent Radical Civic Union (Unión Cívica Radical Intransigente, UCRI)
Radical Civic Union of the People (Unión Cívica Radical del Pueblo, UCRP)
Democratic Socialist Party (Partido Democrático Socialista, PSD)
Argentine Socialist Party (1915) (Partido Socialista Argentino, PSA)
Argentine Socialist Party (1958) (Partido Socialista Argentino, PSA)
Revolutionary and Popular Indoamericano Front (Frente Revolucionario Indoamericano Popular, FRIP'
Union of the Argentine People (Unión del Pueblo Argentino, UDELPA)
Argentine Socialist Vanguard Party (Partido Socialista Argentino de Vanguardia, PSAV)
Socialist Party of the National Left (Partido Socialista de la Izquierda Nacional, PSIN)
Popular Socialist Party (Partido Socialista Popular, PSP)
Worker's Socialist Party (Partido Socialista de los Trabajadores, PST)
Federalist Popular Alliance (Alianza Popular Federalista, APF)
Revolutionary Popular Alliance (Alianza Popular Revolucionaria, APR)
Justicialist Front for National Liberation (Frente Justicialista de Liberación Nacional, FREJULI)
Autonomist Party of Corrientes

Late 20th Century and early 21st Century
Federalist Popular Force (Fuerza Federalista Popular, FuFePo)
Autonomist-Liberal Pact (Pacto Autonomista-Liberal, Corrientes Province)
Alliance for Work, Justice and Education (Alianza por el Trabajo, la Justicia y la Educación, ALIANZA)
Front for a Country in Solidarity (Frente para un País Solidario, Frepaso)
Argentines for a Republic of Equals (Argentinos por una República de Iguales, ARI)
United Left (Izquierda Unida, IU)
People's Reconstruction Party
Front for Change (Frente para el Cambio)
Broad Encounter (Encuentro Amplio)
An Advanced Nation (UNA) (una Nación Avanzada, UNA'')

See also
 Politics of Argentina
 List of political parties by country

References

Politics of Argentina
Political parties
Argentina
 
 
Political parties
Argentina